Fraxinus platypoda (syn. Fraxinus spaethiana), the Chinese red ash, is a species of flowering plant in the family Oleaceae, native to central China, and Japan. In the latter stages of succession it often dominates the mountain riparian forest habitat in which it is found.

It has high resistance to the emerald ash borer (Agrilus planipennis). A slow-growing deciduous tree, it is used as a street tree in Aarhus, Denmark and Malmö, Sweden.

References

platypoda
Trees of China
Flora of North-Central China
Flora of South-Central China
Flora of Japan
Plants described in 1890